The Lê Quý Đôn is a tall ship of the Vietnam People's Navy (Hải quân Nhân dân Việt Nam). She is named in honour of the Vietnamese philosopher Lê Quý Đôn (1726–1784). The maiden voyage with a mixed crew of Vietnamese and Polish sailors started on 27. September 2015 from Gdańsk to Nha Trang, where she is based now.

The ship
The training ship was ordered in 2013 at Marine Projects Ltd. in Gdańsk, Poland. The vessel was designed by Polish naval architect Zygmunt Choreń, for Vietnam Navy, and built by the Remontowa Shipyard in Gdańsk, Poland.
The three-masted barque is carrying 1400 m² sails made of synthetic materials, her hull is made of steel. She has a crew of 30 plus 80 cadets.

References

External links

 Marine Projects Ltd.: MAIDEN VOYAGE OF SAIL TRAINING SHIP ‘LE QUY DON’

Barques
Individual sailing vessels
Ships built in Gdańsk
Ships of the Vietnam People's Navy
Tall ships
Three-masted ships
2014 ships
Naval ships built in Poland for export